= C. J. Ponraj =

C. J. Ponraj is an Indian Administrative Service Officer from Nagercoil, Tamil Nadu, India. He serves at Nagaland, India. He is the Principal Law Secretary and former Chief Electoral Officer at Kohima, Nagaland.
